Robinsonekspedisjonen 2021 is the sixteenth season of the Norwegian reality television series Robinsonekspedisjonen. After TV2 cancelled the series after the 2016 season. It was meant to make a comeback in 2020 but due to the COVID-19 pandemic, the series was pushed back a year. The new host of the series is Silje Torp with the season also filming in the Dominican Republic. The season is the first to air on TV3 since 2013 when TV2 bought the rights to the series. The season premiered on 30 August 2021.

Contestants

Challenges

Voting history

Notes

References

External links

2021
2021 Norwegian television seasons